Gotham Writers Workshop is the United States's largest adult-education writing school. It was founded in New York City in 1993 by writers Jeff Fligelman and David Grae. It was one of the first schools to offer online education, launching its online creative writing classes in 1997.

The workshop offers courses in most of the major genres including fiction and novel writing, screenwriting and television, poetry, and several forms of creative nonfiction, including essay writing and memoir.

It also runs fiction and screenwriting classes in partnership with Zoetrope: All Story, the literary magazine founded by Francis Ford Coppola and Adrienne Brodeur and edited by Michael Ray.

Gotham Writers Workshop has produced three books, edited by school President Alexander Steele: Writing Fiction, Fiction Gallery, and Writing Movies. They have also been translated and published in several languages.

The workshop also publishes a monthly newsletter with writing articles by its faculty and others.

Gotham Writers Workshop has two classroom locations in New York: 1450 Broadway and 555 8th Avenue.

Faculty 

Gotham faculty are all working writers, published in their fields and experienced teachers. Recent faculty include: novelist and Bookslut managing editor Charles Blackstone, novelist Susan Breen, playwright Richard Caliban, memoirist and novelist Kerry Cohen, novelist and former Random House senior editor Anita Diggs, longtime New York Times editor and author Francis Flaherty, travel writer and novelist James Bernard Frost, television writer Kellye Garrett, novelist Shari Goldhagen, fiction writer Manuel Gonzales, screenwriter Doug Katz, young-adult novelist Kody Keplinger, Oscar-winning screenwriter and director Jennifer Lee, science fiction novelist Daniel Marcus, TV writer and comedian Jim Mendrinos, short-story writer Kyle Minor, memoirist Julie Powell, science fiction writer Michaela Roessner, memoirist Domenica Ruta, fiction writer Hasanthika Sirisena, journalist Steven James Snyder, TV writer (and former supervising producer of Bones) Laura Wolner, fiction writer and humorist David Yoo, and radio show host and author, Barbara DeMarco-Barrett.

Student body 

Students who began work on successful projects at Gotham include memoirist Annette Berkovits, (In The Unlikeliest Of Places, Wilfrid Laurier University Press, 2014); essayist Chloe Caldwell (Legs Get Led Astray, Future Tense Books, 2012 and Women, Future Tense Books, 2015); middle-grade novelist Josh Farrar, (Rules to Rock By and A Song For Bijou, both Bloomsbury USA, 2013 and 2014, respectively); TV Writer Wendy Riss; fiction writer Chris Tarry, (How To Carry Bigfoot Home, forthcoming by Red Hen Press); and screenwriter Kelly Winsa, (Hi Honey, 2012).

References

External links
 
 Books
 "Grammar Lessons" , with instructor Stephanie Paterik. Howcast and Gotham Writers
 "Gotham Class in Bryant Park"
 "Gotham Writers Stand-Up Comedy Students Perform in NYC Nightclub"
 Sullivan, Andrew. "A Life Condensed", (about Gotham's popular annual 91-Word Memoir Contest), The Dish. 
 Olson, Elizabeth. "Appeal of Writing Memoir Grows, as Do Publishing Options", The New York Times, October 10, 2014. 
 Jillian Anthony.  "New Year State of Mind" , Time Out New York, December 14, 2015.
 Arends, Brett. "Don't Be A Lousy Gift Giver", The Wall Street Journal, December 3, 2013. 
 Cole, Samantha. "Five Job-Boosting Skills You Can Learn In A Weekend", Fast Company, March 20, 2015. 
 Karetnick, Jen. "Behind the Scenes of Teenage Writing Competitions", The Atlantic, June 30, 2015
 Russell, Anna. "When Elmore Leonard Broke His Own Rules", The Wall Street Journal, June 11, 2015
 "The Story Begins", W42ST Magazine, January 2016.

Creative writing programs
Educational institutions established in 1993
Education in New York City
1993 establishments in New York City